Nebojša Jovanović (born 27 March 1983 in Belgrade) is a Serbian professional road bicycle racer. He was the National Road Race Champion for Serbia and Montenegro in 2004.

He represented Serbia at the 2008 Summer Olympics and finished in 84th place.

Major results

2003
 6th Road race, UEC European Under-23 Road Championships
2004
 1st Road race, Serbia and Montenegro National Road Championships
 3rd Overall Tour de Serbie
2005
 3rd Overall Tour of Greece
1st Stage 1
 5th Trofeo Alcide Degasperi
2006
 10th Overall Tour de Serbie
2007
 5th Belgrade–Banja Luka II
 5th Grand Prix Kooperativa
2008
 2nd Road race, Serbian National Road Championships
 2nd Grand Prix Kooperativa
 6th Overall Tour de Serbie
 7th Overall Tour d'Egypte
 8th Tour of Vojvodina I
2009
 1st Overall Grand Prix Bradlo
 1st Stage 6 Tour de Serbie
 3rd Road race, Serbian National Road Championships
 9th Overall Tour d'Egypte
2010
 3rd Road race, Serbian National Road Championships
 9th Coupe des Carpathes
2011
 3rd Overall Tour of Alanya
2012
 2nd Grand Prix Dobrich I
 5th Grand Prix Dobrich II
 9th Overall Tour of Greece
2014
 3rd Road race, Serbian National Road Championships
 10th Overall Sharjah International Cycling Tour
2015
 4th UAE Cup
2016
 2nd Road race, Serbian National Road Championships

References

External links

1983 births
Serbian male cyclists
Living people
Olympic cyclists of Serbia
Cyclists at the 2008 Summer Olympics
Sportspeople from Belgrade